Narrow-gap semiconductors are semiconducting materials with a band gap that is comparatively small compared to that of silicon, i.e. smaller than 1.11 eV at room temperature. They are used as infrared detectors or thermoelectrics.

List of narrow-gap semiconductors

{| class="wikitable"
|-
!Name
!Chemical formula
!Groups
!Band gap (300 K)
|-
| Mercury cadmium telluride
| Hg1−xCdxTe
| II-VI
| 0 to 1.5 eV
|-
| Mercury zinc telluride
| Hg1−xZnxTe
| II-VI
| 0.15 to 2.25 eV
|-
| Lead selenide
| PbSe
| IV-VI
| 0.27 eV
|-
| Lead(II) sulfide
| PbS
| IV-VI
| 0.37 eV
|-
| Lead telluride
| PbTe
| IV-VI
| 0.32 eV
|-
| Indium arsenide
| InAs
| III-V
| 0.354 eV
|-
| Indium antimonide
| InSb
| III-V
| 0.17 eV
|-
|Gallium antimonide
| GaSb
| III-V
| 0.67 eV
|-
| Cadmium arsenide
| Cd3As2
| II-V
| 0.5 to 0.6 eV
|-
| Bismuth telluride
| Bi2Te3
|
| 0.21 eV
|-
| Tin telluride
| SnTe
| IV-VI 
| 0.18 eV
|-
| Tin selenide
| SnSe
| IV-VI
| 0.9 eV
|-
| Silver(I) selenide
| Ag2Se
| 
| 0.07 eV
|-
|Magnesium silicide
|Mg2Si
|II-IV
|0.79 eV
|}

See also
 List of semiconductor materials
 Wide-bandgap semiconductor

References

 Dornhaus, R., Nimtz, G., Schlicht, B. (1983). Narrow-Gap Semiconductors. Springer Tracts in Modern Physics 98,  (print)  (online) 
 

Semiconductor material types